Charles James McDonnell (July 7, 1928 – February 13, 2020) was an American Roman Catholic titular bishop of Pocofeltus and auxiliary bishop of the Roman Catholic Archdiocese of Newark, New Jersey.

Biography
Born in Queens, New York, McDonnell was ordained for the Newark Archdiocese on May 29, 1954.

On March 15, 1994, he was named bishop and was consecrated as bishop on May 21, 1994. Bishop McDonnell retired on May 21, 2004. He died on February 13, 2020, aged 91.

Awards and decorations
Among his awards and decorations are:
Legion of Merit (with one bronze oak leaf cluster)
Soldier's Medal
Bronze Star
Meritorious Service Medal (with three bronze oak leaf clusters)
Air Medal
Army Commendation Medal (with two bronze oak leaf clusters)
Presidential Unit Citation
Army Meritorious Unit Commendation
Republic of Korea Presidential Unit Citation
Vietnam Gallantry Cross Unit Citation
Vietnam Civil Actions Unit Citation
National Defense Service Medal
Armed Forces Expeditionary Medal
Vietnam Service Medal (with four bronze service stars)
Armed Forces Reserve Medal
Army Service Ribbon
Overseas Service Ribbon (with award numeral 2)
Vietnam Campaign Medal

See also
 

 Catholic Church hierarchy
 Catholic Church in the United States
 Historical list of the Catholic bishops of the United States
 List of Catholic bishops of the United States
 Lists of patriarchs, archbishops, and bishops

References

External links
Roman Catholic Archdiocese of Newark Official Site

Episcopal succession

1928 births
2020 deaths
Clergy from Newark, New Jersey
People from Queens, New York
21st-century American Roman Catholic titular bishops
Catholics from New York (state)
20th-century American Roman Catholic titular bishops